The Syracuse Mile was a  dirt oval raceway  located at the New York State Fairgrounds in Syracuse, New York. Originally built for harness racing in 1826, the first auto race was run in 1903, making it the second oldest auto racing facility in United States history. The track and grandstands were torn down in 2016 by state government officials with the plan to modernize facilities.

Harness racing

The Syracuse Mile hosted harness racing from its opening until 2005.  The Hambletonian Stakes were held from 1926 through 1929.    In the early 1970s, a new 16,000-seat grandstand was built as part of an unsuccessful attempt to bring back the Hambletonian Stakes.

Auto racing

In 1900, a $10,000 bid was awarded to build a dirt track suitable for auto racing on the perimeter of the harness track. 
   
The first auto race at the track was held in 1903, and won by Barney Oldfield in his "Baby Bullet".  Oldfield averaged more than 60 mph in a lap around the mile.  Syracuse was one of the several tracks one mile in length that made up the AAA national championship.  From 1925 to 1971 the Fairgrounds Board contracted with former Indianapolis driver Ira Vail to promote auto racing. With Vail's promotion, drivers such as Mario Andretti, A.J. Foyt and Al Unser competed for wins during one of the Indianapolis 500's golden era's, putting the Syracuse Mile in the national spotlight. 

On Labor Day 1949 the sportsman modified stock cars took to the track.  The New York State Fair Championship then became a Labor Day a tradition that lasted until 2003.  Floyd, New York driver Cliff Kotary reigned as State Fair Champion for six straight years (1960-1965).    In 1955 the first of three races for what is now referred to as the NASCAR Cup Series at the fairgrounds. Tim Flock, Buck Baker and Gwyn Staley were victorious in the three events held from 55-57.  NASCAR's Convertible Stock Series also competed in 56 and 57. Curtis Turner and Possum Jones were victorious in those events. 

In 1972, Glenn Donnelly began promoting races at the fairgrounds adding to the Labor Day event with races on the Fourth of July and Columbus Day weekend.  The October race became Super DIRT Week, and continued at the Fairgrounds until 2015.   Buzzie Reutimann beat NASCAR Hall of Famer Jerry Cook for the 1972 Championship.  Brett Hearn of Kinnelon, New Jersey, became the all-time win leader at the "Moody Mile," after claiming 6 Super Dirt Week main event victories and 6 "358 Modified" triumphs, the final coming in 2014.

The “Moody Mile”

The race track was nicknamed "The Moody Mile" after driver Wes Moody turned a 100-mile-per-hour lap in 1970.

Closure

In 2015, New York Governor Andrew Cuomo announced a sweeping redesign of the fairgrounds that included taking out what was the 16,000-seat grandstand and mile-long dirt track.  The last stock car race was held that year on Columbus day weekend.  The Super DIRT Week events were moved to a temporary dirt track at Oswego Speedway.

References

External links

 “Black Flag:We're Losing One Of America's Best Dirt Tracks And It's Heartbreaking.” Japolink.com 

Dirt oval race tracks in the United States
Sports venues in Onondaga County, New York
Motorsport venues in New York (state)
Defunct horse racing venues in the United States
1826 establishments in New York (state)
Sports venues completed in 1826
Sports venues demolished in 2016
Demolished sports venues in New York (state)